This is a list of attacks related to secondary schools that have occurred around the world. These are attacks that have occurred on school property or related primarily to school issues or events. A narrow definition of the word attacks is used for this list so as to exclude warfare, robberies, gang violence, public attacks (as in political protests), accidental shootings, and suicides and murder–suicides by rejected spouses or suitors. Incidents that involved only staff who work at the school have been classified as belonging at List of workplace killings. It also excludes events where no injuries take place, if an attack is foiled and attacks that took place at colleges.

The listed attacks include shootings, stabbings, slashings, bombings, and beatings administered with blunt instruments.

Secondary school incidents

1850s

1860s

1870s

1880s

1890s
{| class="wikitable sortable" style="font-size:90%;"
|-
! style="width:65px;"| Date
! style="width:85px;"| Location
! style="width:75px;"| Attacker(s)
! data-sort-type="number" style="width:75px;"| Dead
! data-sort-type="number" style="width:75px;"| Injured
! Description
|-
| March 26, 1893
|Plain Dealing, Louisiana, United States
|
|align="center"|4 dead
|align="center"|1 injured
| During an evening school dance at Plain Dealing High School, a fight broke out. Two youths were shot dead, two more were fatally wounded, and the high school's Professor Johnson was shot in the arm.
|-
| January 26, 1899
| Albany, Missouri, United States
| Charles Ayres
| align="center"|1 dead
|
| When he got whipped by his teacher T. B. Hunter, 13-year-old student Charles Ayres drew a jackknife and slashed the teacher's throat.<ref>Schoolboy stabs teacher, The New York Times (January 27, 1899)</ref>
|}

1900s

1910s

1920s

1930s

1940s

1950s

1960s

1970s

1980s

1990s

2000s

2010s

2020s

 See also 
School bullying
School shooting
List of school-related attacks
List of school shootings in the United States (before 2000)
List of school shootings in the United States (2000–present)
List of attacks related to primary schools
List of attacks related to post-secondary schools
List of rampage killers: School massacres

Notes

References

External links
School-Related Deaths, School Shootings, & School Violence Incidents: 2000–2001, National School Safety and Security ServicesSchool-Related Deaths, School Shootings, & School Violence Incidents: 2002–2003, National School Safety and Security ServicesSchool-Related Deaths, School Shootings, & School Violence Incidents: 2004–2005, National School Safety and Security ServicesSchool-Related Deaths, School Shootings, & School Violence Incidents: 2006–2007, National School Safety and Security ServicesSchool-Related Deaths, School Shootings, & School Violence Incidents: 2007–2008, National School Safety and Security ServicesSchool-Related Deaths, School Shootings, & School Violence Incidents: 2008–2009, National School Safety and Security ServicesSchool-Related Deaths, School Shootings, & School Violence Incidents: 2009–2010, National School Safety and Security Services''

Crime-related lists
Secondary education-related lists
secondary